Kingsley and Froghall is a former railway station of the North Staffordshire Railway (NSR) that is now preserved on the Churnet Valley Railway in Staffordshire, England.

History
Kingsley and Froghall station, situated on the Churnet Valley Line of the North Staffordshire Railway, was opened to both passengers and goods on 1 September 1849.

The station was a busy country station serving the needs of workers at nearby Thomas Bolton's copper refinery.

As with many UK railways, passenger numbers in the 1960s decreased to such an extent that the station was closed to both passengers and goods in 1965.

Re-opening and the Churnet Valley Railway

During the 1970s, a railway preservation base was set up at nearby Cheddleton station; later, this was to become the base of the Churnet Valley Railway (CVR). The CVR had been progressing slowly in preserving the line when, in the late 1990s, they had reached the station site. After closure by British Rail, the station buildings had been demolished. Initial rebuilding of the station resulted in the down platform reopening for passengers on 11 August 2001. Construction began later on the new station building, which opened on 19 July 2003.

Since 2003, more work has been done on the station to make the site as complete as the nearby Consall. Initially, this involved resurfacing the down platform and adding fences, a few small buildings and station furniture. With this side now relatively complete, attention has been turned to the second (up) platform where the overhang on the canal and associated fences have been rebuilt, along with walls and the large waiting shelter but, this platform is not in use.

Kingsley and Froghall is currently the southern limit of passenger operations on the CVR, but plans exist to extend towards Oakamoor and Alton Towers.

Notes

External links
Churnet Valley Railway homepage

Heritage railway stations in Staffordshire
Former North Staffordshire Railway stations
Beeching closures in England
Railway stations in Great Britain opened in 1849
Railway stations in Great Britain closed in 1965
1849 establishments in England
Railway stations in Great Britain opened in 2001